Ali Zia (born March 20, 1957 in Lahore) is a former Pakistani first-class cricketer who played from 1974/75 until 1992/93. In 165 games he made 8579 runs at 33.90 and scored 13 hundreds with a best of 229 not out. With the ball he managed 241 wickets at 28.39, once taking 8 for 60 in an innings.	 	

Ali, along with Mohsin Kamal, coached Bangladesh in the 2003 World Cup.

External links
 Cricinfo

1957 births
Living people
Pakistani cricketers
Punjab (Pakistan) cricketers
Lahore City cricketers
Lahore City Whites cricketers
National Bank of Pakistan cricketers
United Bank Limited cricketers
House Building Finance Corporation cricketers
Punjab A cricketers
Lahore A cricketers
Pakistan Universities cricketers
Pakistani cricket coaches